Samson is a 1915 American silent drama film directed by Edgar Lewis and starring William Farnum, Maude Gilbert and Edgar L. Davenport. It is an adaptation of Henri Bernstein's play Samson. Farnum later appeared in a second adaptation Shackles of Gold, although the setting was switched from France to America.

Cast
 William Farnum as Maurice Brachard  
 Maude Gilbert as Marie D'Andolin  
 Edgar L. Davenport as Marquis D'Amdprom  
 Agnes Everett as Marquise D'Andolin  
 Harry Spingler as Max D'Andolin  
 Charles Guthrie as Jerome Govaine  
 Carey Lee as Elise Vernette  
 George De Carlton as M. Deveraux  
 Elmer Peterson as M. Fontenay  
 Edward Kyle as Baron Hatzfeldt

References

Bibliography
 Goble, Alan.  The Complete Index to Literary Sources in Film. Walter de Gruyter, 1999.

External links 
 

1915 films
1915 drama films
Silent American drama films
American silent feature films
1910s English-language films
Films directed by Edgar Lewis
American films based on plays
American black-and-white films
Fox Film films
1910s American films